Michelle La Rue is a conservation biologist and ecologist based at the University of Canterbury in Christchurch, New Zealand.

Her research focuses on using satellite imagery to understand polar animals, including emperor penguins and crabeater seals. She has visited Antarctica at least six times.

Education 
LaRue started her scientific career at Minnesota State University, Mankato where she completed a Bachelor of Science majoring in ecology. This involved researching the food habits of hoary bats by dissecting and identifying the remains of insects in their guano. She also completed modelling of white-tail deer populations using distance sampling techniques.

She went on to gain a Master's degree in Zoology at the Southern Illinois University Carbondale where she studied the habitat and dispersal of cougars.

LaRue has a doctorate in Conservation Biology from the University of Minnesota. This saw her use high-resolution satellite imagery to study the population dynamics, biogeography, and threats to polar animals.

References 

American women biologists
American ecologists
Women ecologists
University of Minnesota College of Science and Engineering alumni
Southern Illinois University Carbondale alumni
Living people
Year of birth missing (living people)
Minnesota State University, Mankato alumni
21st-century American women